is a Japanese writer, best known for his Space Brothers series, published regularly since 2007.

On 2 November 2016 his artwork was carried into space by the H-IIA rocket carrying the Himawari-9 weather satellite  as part of an outreach project organized by the Young Astronauts Club Japan.

References

External links

 Interview with Koyama

1978 births
Manga artists from Kyoto Prefecture
Living people